Beekkant is a Brussels Metro station located in the municipality of Molenbeek-Saint-Jean, in the western part of Brussels, Belgium. It opened on 8 May 1981 as part of the Sainte-Catherine/Sint-Katelijne–Beekkant extension of former line 1, and was for a year, until 6 October 1982, the western terminus of the metro. Following the reorganisation of the Brussels Metro on 4 April 2009, it is served by lines 1, 2, 5 and 6.

The metro station runs parallel to a railway used for freight trains, and from 2010 again, as a suburban railway line of the future Brussels Regional Express Network (RER/GEN).

Connections
The station offers the following connections:

 The trains of the line 1 from the east continue their route towards Gare de l'Ouest/Weststation and Stockel/Stokkel.
 The trains of the line 5 from the east continue their route towards Erasme/Erasmus and Herrmann-Debroux.
 The trains of the line 2 from Gare de l'Ouest/Weststation continue their route towards Simonis.
 The trains of the line 6 from Gare de l'Ouest/Weststation continue their route towards Roi Baudouin/Koning Boudewijn.
 The trains of the lines 2 and 6 towards Gare de l'Ouest/Weststation continue their route towards Elisabeth/Elizabeth.

References

External links

Brussels metro stations
Railway stations opened in 1981
Molenbeek-Saint-Jean

1981 establishments in Belgium